The 1969–70 Montreal Canadiens season was the club's 61st season of play. The Canadiens placed fifth in the East division and missed the playoffs for the first time since the 1947–48 season, ending their 21-season playoff streak. This team was also the only Canadiens team between the 1948–49 season and the 1993–94 season that missed the playoffs, a span of 46 years.

Regular season
April 5, 1970 – The Montreal Canadiens were in a desperate race to qualify for the NHL playoffs. The Canadiens visit the Chicago Black Hawks. With 9:30 left in regulation time, Montreal was down by a score of 5–2. Montreal's only hope of qualifying for the playoffs was to score three more goals. Canadiens coach Claude Ruel removed his goalie, Rogatien Vachon from the net. Vachon would return to the net only for faceoffs. Unfortunately, luck ran out as Chicago scored five empty net goals and win the game by a score of 10–2 combined with the Rangers 9–5 win over Detroit. Montreal missed the playoffs for the first time in 22 years.

Final standings

Schedule and results

Player statistics

Regular season
Scoring

Goaltending

Awards and records
 Jacques Laperriere, Defence, NHL Second Team All-Star

Transactions

Draft picks

See also
 1969–70 NHL season

References

External links
 Canadiens on Hockey Database
 Canadiens on NHL Reference

Montreal Canadiens seasons
Mon
Mon